Bidhannagar is a planned urban agglomeration in the Indian state of West Bengal, and a satellite township of Kolkata. It falls in Greater Kolkata region and currently falls under the administration of the Bidhannagar Municipal Corporation. Keeping with its original name, it is commonly referred to as Salt Lake City, and was planned and developed between 1958 and 1965 to accommodate the burgeoning population of Kolkata.

Demographics
At the 2011 census, Bidhannagar Municipality had a population of 218,323 (males 111,363; females 106,960) in an area of approximately 13.16 square km with a density of about 16,590 persons per square kilometre. However, the area of Bidhannagar Municipality was 33.50 square km (much bigger than Salt Lake City) because it includes East Kolkata Wetlands area, where very few floating people live. Bidhannagar Municipality has an average literacy rate of 90.44% (higher than the national average of 74%), with male literacy of 93.08% and female literacy of 87.69%.

The city has the second-highest proportion of graduates in the country (30.6 per cent), only after Sahibzada Ajit Singh Nagar, also known as Mohali, which has 34.4 per cent of its population as graduates.

Geography

It has an average elevation of 11 metres (49 ft).

Administration

Present
Ultimately in 1995, Bidhannagar got its own elected body called Bidhannagar Municipality consisting of 23 wards (later increased to 25 wards). All the plots of land in Bidhanannagar are leasehold plots and the Urban Development Department (the Lessor) directly manages the land matters. East Kolkata Wetlands area is also included in Bidhannagar Municipality. The proposal for the merger of Bidhannagar Municipality with the Kolkata Municipal Corporation has been periodically mooted since 2011, but never realised due to different custodian of land and property tax-structures. Kolkata Airport, Rajarhat-Gopalpur (Kaikhali, Teghoria, Baguiati, Hatiara, Kestopur), parts of South Dum Dum (Dum Dum Park, Bangur Avenue, Lake Town) and Bidhannagar Municipality are already brought together under the jurisdiction of the Bidhannagar Police Commissionerate. On 18 June 2015, Bidhannagar Municipal Corporation (BMC) was constituted by merging the existing municipal areas of Bidhannagar Municipality, Rajarhat-Gopalpur Municipality and the panchayat area of Mahishbathan II Gram Panchayat. Now Bidhannagar Municipality has 14 wards (ward no. 28 to 41) under Bidhannagar Municipal Corporation.

Nabadiganta Industrial Township Authority (NDITA) was created in January 2006. It supplies water; maintains sewerage, roads, street signals; furnishes important buildings and collects property tax and fees in Sector - V (excluded from the jurisdiction of Bidhannagar Municipal Corporation).

Police
The Bidhannagar Police Commissionerate is responsible for law enforcement in the city.

Transport

The modes of transportation like other parts of Kolkata includes air conditioned/non-ac government/private buses, taxi and other popular options like auto rickshaw and e-rickshaws. The Howrah Maidan - Salt Lake Sector V - Teghoria (Haldiram) Line (Line 2) of the Kolkata Metro is in operation since 14 February 2020 between Salt Lake Sector V and Salt Lake Stadium. The New Garia – Dum Dum Airport Line (Line 6) of the Kolkata Metro, which passes through the Salt Lake Bypass, is under-construction with cost inflation and delays

Colleges
All India Institute of Hygiene and Public Health (Second campus)
Bidhannagar College 
Bose Institute
Government College of Engineering and Leather Technology
Indian Institute of Foreign Trade, Kolkata
Institute of Engineering and Management
International School of Business and Media
Maulana Abul Kalam Azad University of Technology
National Institute of Fashion Technology
National Institute of Homoeopathy 
National Council of Science Museums
Rabindra Bharati University
Saha Institute of Nuclear Physics
S.N. Bose National Centre for Basic Sciences
Techno India University
Jadavpur University's Second Campus
University of Calcutta's Technology Campus
Unitedworld School of Business
Variable Energy Cyclotron Centre
West Bengal National University of Juridical Sciences

Schools
Schools in Bidhannagar include the Hariyana Vidya Mandir, Bidhannagar Government High School, Bidhannagar Municipal School, a combined primary and high school and a branch of Bharatiya Vidya Bhavan, named Bhavan's Gangabux Kanoria Vidyamandir, Salt Lake School, Mother International School, Sri Aurobindo Institute of Education, Laban Hrad Vidyapith. Also, there are two Kendriya Vidyalaya in Salt Lake viz. K.V. No. 1 Salt Lake and K.V. No. 2 Salt Lake.

Catholic schools include St. Joan's School, Our Lady Queen of the Missions School and St. Francis Xavier School.

See also
 Satellite city
 Salt Lake Stadium
 Nicco Park

References

External links

 
Bidhannagar Municipal Corporation 

Cities and towns in North 24 Parganas district
Neighbourhoods in North 24 Parganas district
Neighbourhoods in Kolkata
Planned cities in India
Populated places established in 1962
1962 establishments in West Bengal
Kolkata Metropolitan Area